Carolina Power and Light Company Car Barn and Automobile Garage is a historic streetcar barn and automobile repair shop located at Raleigh, North Carolina.  It built in 1925 and is a one-story, rectangular brick building in the Art Deco style. It measures 210 feet and 6 inches in length and 59 feet and 7 inches in width and features terra cotta ornamentation. The building was originally built to house the Carolina Power and Light Company's electric streetcars and buses and was converted to automotive and service vehicle storage in the 1940s.

It was listed on the National Register of Historic Places in 1997.

References 

Commercial buildings on the National Register of Historic Places in North Carolina
Art Deco architecture in North Carolina
Commercial buildings completed in 1925
Buildings and structures in Raleigh, North Carolina
National Register of Historic Places in Raleigh, North Carolina